"White Girl" is the debut single by hip hop trio U.S.D.A. from their debut album Cold Summer. The song was named after the slang term for cocaine, "White Girl".

Remix
The official remix features Fabolous, Rick Ross and Lil Wayne.

Chart positions

References

2007 singles
Song recordings produced by Drumma Boy
2007 songs
Def Jam Recordings singles
Gangsta rap songs
Songs about drugs